Karess Bashar (b. Damascus - 16 February 1976) is a Syrian film and TV actress. She has played many roles on Syrian soap operas. Her only feature film is Usama Muhammad's The Box of Life.

References

Living people
Syrian film actresses
Syrian television actresses
People from Damascus
1976 births
21st-century Syrian actresses
Soap opera actresses
Syrian Kurdish women